Naval Academy is a 1941 American action film directed by Erle C. Kenton and written by David Silverstein and Gordon Rigby. The film stars Freddie Bartholomew, Jimmy Lydon, Billy Cook, Pierre Watkin, Warren Ashe and Jimmy Butler. The film was released on June 5, 1941, by Columbia Pictures.

Plot

Cast          
Freddie Bartholomew as Steve Kendall
Jimmy Lydon as Tommy Blake
Billy Cook as Dick Brewster
Pierre Watkin as Capt. Davis
Warren Ashe as Lt. Brackett
Jimmy Butler as Matt Cooper 
Douglas Scott as Jimmy Henderson
Warren McCollum as Cadet 
Calvin Ellison as Cadet
Joe Brown Jr. as Bill Foster
David Durand as Fred Bailey
Tommy Bupp as Joey Martin
John Dilson as John Frazier
William Blees as CPO Caldwell

References

External links
 

1941 films
American action films
1940s action films
Columbia Pictures films
Films directed by Erle C. Kenton
American black-and-white films
1940s English-language films
1940s American films
English-language action films